Linford Cicero Christie  (born 2 April 1960) is a Jamaican-born British former sprinter. He is the only British man to have won gold medals in the 100 metres at all four major competitions open to British athletes: the Olympic Games, the World Championships, the European Championships and the Commonwealth Games. He was the first European athlete to break the 10-second barrier in the 100 m and still holds the British record in the event. He is a former world indoor record holder over 200 metres, and a former European record holder in the 60 metres, 100 m and 4 × 100 metres relay.

He remains one of the most highly decorated British athletes of all-time. By the end of his track career Christie had won 24 medals overall, more than any other British male athlete before or since. In 1993 he was awarded the BBC Sports Personality of the Year.

Christie tested positive for a banned stimulant in 1988 during the Seoul Olympics. In 1999 he was suspended for two years by the IAAF after the banned substance nandrolone was found in a test.

Early life and education
Christie was born on 2 April 1960 in Saint Andrew, Jamaica, where he was brought up by his maternal grandmother. At the age of seven he joined his parents, who had emigrated to Acton, London, England, five years before. He was educated at Henry Compton Secondary School in Fulham, London and excelled in physical education. He competed in the very first London Youth Games in 1977 for the borough of Hammersmith & Fulham. He also joined the Air Training Corps in 1978, 336 (Hammersmith) Squadron. He did not take up athletics seriously until he was 18.

Professional athletics career
Christie's early track career was not particularly promising. A comparatively slow starter, he failed to make the Great Britain team for the 1984 Summer Olympics, not even being included in the sprint relay squad. It was not until some years after he had begun to work in earnest on his running technique under the coaching guidance of Ron Roddan in 1979 that he fulfilled his potential.

In 1986, he was the surprise winner of the 100 m at the European Championships and finished second in the same event at the Commonwealth Games in Edinburgh, behind Ben Johnson. At the 1987 World Championships in Athletics in Rome, Christie came fourth in the 100 m, but was later awarded the bronze medal, when winner Johnson was disqualified after admitting years of steroid use.

At the 1988 Summer Olympics in Seoul, Christie won the 100 m silver behind Carl Lewis after Johnson, who set a world record in 9.79 seconds, was again disqualified following a positive drug test. Christie's time was 9.97 seconds, a new European record by 0.03 seconds and this was only the third time that an athlete had broken the ten second barrier in the 100 metres without winning the race.

In 1992, Christie became the third British athlete to win the Olympic 100 m, after Harold Abrahams and Allan Wells, winning the title ahead of Frankie Fredericks of Namibia at the Barcelona Olympic Games. In the absence of his great rival Lewis, Christie ran 9.96 s in the final, and at the age of 32 years 121 days became the oldest Olympic 100 m champion by four years and 38 days.

In 1993, he became the first man in history to hold the Olympic, World, European and Commonwealth titles in the 100m as he was victorious at the Stuttgart World Championships in his fastest ever time of 9.87. The time still stands as the British record as of 2022. His achievement saw him being voted BBC Sports Personality of the Year by the British public that year.

The following year, in 1994, he defended his Commonwealth title in Victoria in his second fastest ever 100 m time of 9.91.

Defending his Olympic title in 1996, Christie was disqualified in the final after two false starts. He said: "The first one I knew I did, but on the second one I felt I reacted perfectly to the gun. I have never been disqualified from a race before in my life. What a place to do it." His reaction time was 0.086 seconds. Under IAAF rules, sprinters are not allowed to start from their blocks faster than 0.1 seconds.

Christie retired from representative international competition in 1997, although he continued to make appearances at invitation meetings.

Doping allegations and ban

Early allegations 
Christie faced an International Olympic Committee disciplinary hearing at the 1988 Seoul Olympics because of an adverse drug test for the banned stimulant pseudoephedrine after he ran in the heats of the 200m. He escaped sanction after the committee voted by a margin of 11 to 10 and gave Christie "the benefit of the doubt." Christie argued that he had taken it inadvertently when drinking some ginseng tea.

At the 1994 European championships staged in Helsinki, where British team captain Christie won his third European 100 m title, he was caught up in a doping controversy after Solomon Wariso, a 400 m runner making his international championship debut, tested positive for the stimulant ephedrine. Wariso revealed that he had used an over-the-counter pick-you-up called "Up Your Gas", which Christie had bought at a Florida pharmacy.

In 1998, less than six months before his first positive drug test, Christie won a libel action against the journalist John McVicar. McVicar had insinuated in a satirical magazine that Christie's remarkable rise from 156th in the world to triumph at an age when he should have been in decline could only have been achieved through performance-enhancing drugs. The jury found in Christie's favour by a 10–2 majority. The judge ordered that McVicar should be bound by an injunction restraining him from accusing Christie of taking banned substances. The modest £40,000 damages awarded were outweighed by the legal costs that Christie incurred to bring the case. After the judgment, McVicar called Christie "The Judy Garland of the 100 metres", referring to the emotion that Christie had displayed before the court.

Positive drugs test and ban from athletics 
In February 1999, Christie competed in an indoor meet in Dortmund, Germany. A routine unannounced drug test found the banned substance nandrolone. After a six-month delay, a disciplinary hearing was convened by the British Athletic Federation which found Christie to be not guilty. But the IAAF overruled and confirmed a two-year suspension. He was found to have more than 100 times normal levels of the metabolites of nandrolone in his urine. Various explanations were offered to explain the results, including eating avocado, or using nutritional supplements. The IAAF rejected that explanation and gave Christie a two-years ban from athletics, despite UK Athletics feeling that there was reasonable doubt whether the drug had been taken deliberately, a decision which ignored the usual drug testing principle of "strict liability".

Several alternative theories have been proposed that might explain Christie's positive test. Nandrolone is a long-acting anabolic steroid, and is well-known in athlete circles to be detectable in blood and urine screenings for long periods; ranging from 6 to 18 months. Skeptics of Christie's positive, and other Nandrolone sanctions in the late 1990s, have cited this detection window as a major deterrent to using the drug at any point during training or competition periods. Around this time pro-hormones like 19-norandrostenedione, Androstenedione, and 1-Testosterone, among others, abounded in the American supplement market, and were not yet codified as 'anabolic agents' under the Federal Controlled Substances Act. Given that Christie tested positive for Nandrolone, it is conceivable that he had been taking 19-norandrostenedione, a metabolic precursor to Nandrolone (this was sold over-the-counter in the United States until 2004). At the time Christie had been training in Florida in the winter months, and may have been using the prohormone without knowing it could produce a positive test.

Alternatively, Christie may have been under the impression he was administering a different anabolic steroid with a narrower testing window. Substances like Masteron and Primobolan are esterified in oil similar to Nandrolone, and would be indistinguishable if mislabeled.

Christie has always denied any wrongdoing. "If I took drugs there had to be a reason to take drugs. I had pretty much retired from the sport." Furthermore, he denied that his physique was gained through drug use and promoted an anti-steroid approach: "It does not follow that all athletes who are big take drugs ... Only by testing all athletes will the sport be kept clean of drugs."

Fallout following positive drugs test 
Following his positive drugs test and ban from athletics, Christie was banned for life from the British Olympic Association, who announced that Christie would not be accredited for any future Olympic Games, in accordance with their regulations.

Following the positive drugs test, the IAAF prohibited Christie from attending the Olympic Games in Sydney as a member of the BBC commentating team.

The ban also resulted in Puma opting not to continue Christie's £100,000 sponsorship contract.

Retirement
Following the two-year ban, Christie worked as a presenter on the BBC programmes Record Breakers and Garden Invaders, and also had a contract with BBC Sport. He has spent less time as a public figure and has devoted most of his time to managing his company. In 1990 he made his acting debut in the BBC programme Grange Hill. Later he appeared in another BBC programme Hustle. In 2010, Christie appeared on the UK ITV television channel's I'm a Celebrity... Get Me Out of Here! show, subsequently becoming the sixth person to be eliminated, on 30 November 2010.

During the McVicar case, Christie raised another of his grievances with the media – insinuating comments about the figure-hugging running suits that Christie wore in his races. The term Linford's lunchbox had been coined by The Sun newspaper in reference to the noticeable bulge of Christie's genitalia in his Lycra shorts. He said "Linford's lunchbox is one of my grievances with the media. I don't like it ... Nobody ever goes on about Sally Gunnell's breasts ... I think it is disgusting, I don't like it at all." In court, the judge Mr Justice Popplewell, amused some by tactlessly asking Christie to explain the phrase, asking "What is 'Linford's lunchbox?'" The reference to his genital bulge became a part of pop culture at the time, as evidenced in a joke by Nick Hancock: "There's nothing new you can say about Linford Christie, except he's slow and has got a small penis".

Christie's anger at this unwanted attention led to his infamous "newspaper print" running suit, although he has deliberately drawn attention to his body on occasions: he has remarked that "A lot of people have looked at my physique and two things can come into their mind – admiration and envy." He also appeared shirtless and flexing his muscles on the BBC youth series Reportage in 1988. In recent years, however, Christie appears to have come to terms with the 'lunchbox' label, disclosing his preference for briefs rather than boxer shorts, and in 2002 becoming the "face" of Sloggi, the men's underwear brand, posing for advertising wearing only underwear.

In the successful British bid for the 2012 Olympic Games, Christie was absent from the team, even though he has stated that he attempted to get involved. Christie has cited an ongoing feud between himself and former teammate Sebastian Coe, who led the bid committee, as a likely reason for the snub, Commenting on the argument, Christie's teammate, Derek Redmond, said he was "a well-balanced athlete; he has a chip on both shoulders."

However, in April 2006, it was announced that Christie would be a senior mentor for athletes on the national team, along with former athletes Steve Backley, Daley Thompson and Katharine Merry. This proved controversial however, due to Christie's 2 year drugs ban in February 1997. "I don't think he should be in that mentor role," said Paula Radcliffe, the former women's marathon world record-holder. "We have to make sure that the people in that mentor role have an integrity and strong sense of ethics and morals."

The BOA has confirmed that their ban on Olympic accreditation for Christie remains in place. Christie claims that he was invited by London Mayor Ken Livingstone to be one of the carriers of the 2008 Olympic Torch on its journey through London, however Livingstone denies that he invited Christie to undertake this role. The IOC reacted angrily to any suggestion that "an athlete who has an Olympic ban" could have been invited to carry the Olympic torch.

In 2011, Christie was convicted of careless driving, after his vehicle crashed head-on into a taxi on 8 May 2010 due to driving on the wrong side of the A413 road in Chalfont St Peter, Buckinghamshire. Four people, including a newly-wed couple, were hurt.

Achievements and legacy
Reflecting upon his track career, he stated: "I will have no complaints if people remember me as one of the best athletes in the world." He remains the British record-holder at 100 m, with the 9.87 s he ran at the 1993 World Championships. He was the third Briton, after Harold Abrahams and Allan Wells, and the fifth European to win the 100 m at the Olympic Games, and the last to do so until 2021, when Italian Marcell Jacobs took the Olympic title in Tokyo in the delayed 2020 Summer Olympics. He remains the oldest male athlete to win the 100 metres at the Olympics at the age of 32.

As of 2019, Christie's British record of 9.87 seconds in the 100 metres makes him the third fastest European in history; after Francis Obikwelu's 9.86 s personal best which broke Christie's European record, and the same time achieved by French sprinter Jimmy Vicaut. His 100 m personal best fares favourably in comparison with his contemporaries: Carl Lewis and Frankie Fredericks managed 9.86 s while Leroy Burrell ran 9.85 s. Christie broke the ten-second barrier nine times, and was the first European to break the ten-second barrier.  In the 1988 100 metres Olympic final, he became the first man to break the ten-second barrier and not win the race.  In the 1991 World Championships 100 m final, he became the first man to break the ten-second barrier and come fourth, running 9.92 seconds.

In the 4 × 100 m relay event Christie's performance as anchor, alongside Colin Jackson, Tony Jarrett and John Regis, set a European record of 37.77 s at the 1993 World Championships. This was beaten six years later by a 37.73 s run by a British team, which included his protégé Darren Campbell. However, Christie's team's performance is still the second fastest 4 x 100 m performance by a European team and one of the best by a non-United States relay team.

Over 60m, Christie set a European record of 6.47 s in 1995 which was beaten by fellow Briton Jason Gardener in 1999 with 6.46 s. Christie has the fourth fastest time over the distance for a European after Gardener, Ronald Pognon and the current European record holder Dwain Chambers.

Christie also holds 3 current 35–39 masters age group world records. On 23 September 1995, Christie set a M35 world record of 9.97 in the 100 m which no longer stands. On 25 June 1995 he set the current M35 world record in the 200 m in 20.11 seconds and on 3 January 1997 Christie set the current indoor record in the M35 60 m in a time of 6.51 seconds.

Christie broke the world indoor record over 200 m with 20.25 s at Liévin in 1995, and remains the seventh fastest sprinter on the all-time list.

He was appointed MBE in 1990 and OBE in 1998. In 1993, the West London Stadium, where he spent much time training, was renamed the Linford Christie Stadium in his honour. Christie's claim that he started races on the "B of the Bang" inspired a large public sculpture of the same name. Erected as a celebration of the 2002 Commonwealth Games in Manchester, it was officially unveiled by Christie in 2004. Owing to safety concerns, it was dismantled in 2009. In 2010, he was inducted into the England Athletics Hall of Fame, and in 2009, he was inducted into the London Youth Games Hall of Fame.

Statistics

Personal bests

All information taken from IAAF and UK Athletics profiles.

Seasonal bests

All information taken from IAAF and UK Athletics profiles.

International competitions

All information taken from IAAF and UK Athletics profiles.

National titles
UK Athletics Championships
100 metres: 1987, 1990, 1991, 1992, 1993
200 metres: 1985 (shared with John Regis), 1988
AAA Championships
100 metres: 1986, 1988, 1989, 1990†, 1991, 1992, 1993, 1994, 1996
200 metres: 1988
AAA Indoor Championships
60 metres: 1989, 1990, 1991
200 metres: 1981, 1982, 1985†, 1987, 1988, 1989, 1991
† Christie was the top Briton behind Mel Lattany at the 1985 AAA Indoor 200 m
†† Christie was the top Briton behind Calvin Smith at the 1990 AAA 100 m

Circuit wins
All information taken from IAAF and UK Athletics profiles.
100 metres
Gateshead: 1985, 1991, 1993, 1994, 1996
Meeting de Atletismo Madrid: 1986
Prague: 1987
Budapest: 1987
Birmingham: 1987, 1988, 1989, 1991, 1992
London: 1987, 1988, 1989, 1990, 1993, 1996
Meeting Nikaïa: 1988
Sheffield: 1991, 1993
Notturna di Milano: 1992
Cena Slovenska - Slovak Gold: 1992
Golden Gala: 1992, 1993, 1997
Bislett Games: 1992, 1993, 1995
ISTAF Berlin: 1992
Memorial Van Damme: 1993, 1994, 1995
Gran Premio Diputación: 1994
Live Nuremberg: 1994
Weltklasse Zürich: 1994, 1995
Toto International Super Meeting: 1994, 1995
Perth Track Classic: 1995, 1996
Meeting Lille-Métropole: 1995
Rieti Meeting: 1995
Melbourne Track Classic: 1997
Adriaan Paulen Memorial: 1997
200 metres
Gateshead: 1987, 1990
Prague: 1987
Birmingham: 1987, 1988, 1989
Bislett Games: 1987
Athens IAAF Indoor Meeting: 1987
Indoor Flanders Meeting: 1988, 1991, 1994
Cosford Indoor Games: 1988, 1989
Sparkassen Cup: 1989, 1997
London: 1991
Weltklasse in Köln: 1993
Meeting Pas de Calais: 1995
Meeting Lille-Métropole: 1995
60 metres
Glasgow International Match: 1988, 1991, 1994, 1995
Cosford Indoor Games: 1989, 1990
Sparkassen Cup: 1989, 1997
Athens IAAF Indoor Meeting: 1989
Indoor Flanders Meeting: 1991, 1994
Sindelfingen Leichtathletik Grand Prix: 1992, 1994, 1995, 1997
Birmingham Indoor Grand Prix: 1992, 1994
Memorial José María Cagigal: 1994
Gunma International: 1995
Meeting Pas de Calais: 1995

Awards
European Athlete of the Year trophy: 1993
BBC Sports Personality of the Year Award: 1993

Personal life and family
Linford Christie has eight children. His niece Rachel Christie was crowned Miss England in 2009 though later relinquished the title following allegations of assault. His godson Omari Patrick is a professional footballer. His nephew Joshua R Christie represented Jamaica Rugby Team in the 7s tournament in Hong Kong 2018, scoring a try. Joshua also appeared on a reality show, Shipwrecked, in 2019. His son Liam Oliver-Christie was convicted of drugs supply offences in 2018.

In 1993 Christie formed a sports management and promotions company, Nuff Respect, with sprint-hurdler Colin Jackson. One of their early products was a sports training and workout video, The S Plan: Get Fit with Christie and Jackson. Jackson was later to leave the enterprise, saying "Linford has to be in control, he has to be number one, he has to be the leader."

See also
List of men's Olympic and World Championship athletics sprint champions
List of 1988 Summer Olympics medal winners
List of 1992 Summer Olympics medal winners
List of Olympic medalists in athletics (men)
List of World Athletics Championships medalists (men)
List of IAAF World Indoor Championships medalists (men)
List of Commonwealth Games medallists in athletics (men)
List of European Athletics Championships medalists (men)
List of European Athletics Indoor Championships medalists (men)
List of 100 metres national champions (men)
List of 200 metres national champions (men)
100 metres at the Olympics
4 × 100 metres relay at the Olympics
100 metres at the World Championships in Athletics
4 × 100 metres relay at the World Championships in Athletics
Great Britain and Northern Ireland at the World Athletics Championships
List of world records in athletics
List of world records in masters athletics
List of European records in masters athletics
List of doping cases in athletics
List of masters athletes
List of sports announcers
List of RAF Cadets
List of news media phone hacking scandal victims
List of Oxford Street Christmas lights celebrities
List of I'm a Celebrity...Get Me Out of Here! contestants (UK)
List of Jamaican British people
British African-Caribbean people

Notes

Further reading

External links

Masters T&F 100 metres All-Time Rankings 9.97 (men's over 35s world rankings)
Masters T&F 200 metres All-Time Rankings 20.11 (men's over 35s world rankings)
Nuff Respect
Interview with The Guardian

1960 births
Living people
Athletes from London
Athletes (track and field) at the 1988 Summer Olympics
Athletes (track and field) at the 1992 Summer Olympics
Athletes (track and field) at the 1996 Summer Olympics
Athletes (track and field) at the 1986 Commonwealth Games
Athletes (track and field) at the 1990 Commonwealth Games
Athletes (track and field) at the 1994 Commonwealth Games
People from Saint Andrew Parish, Jamaica
People from Acton, London
English male sprinters
British male sprinters
Olympic athletes of Great Britain
English Olympic medallists
Olympic gold medallists for Great Britain
Olympic silver medallists for Great Britain
Olympic gold medalists in athletics (track and field)
Olympic silver medalists in athletics (track and field)
Medalists at the 1988 Summer Olympics
Medalists at the 1992 Summer Olympics
Commonwealth Games gold medallists for England
Commonwealth Games silver medallists for England
Commonwealth Games medallists in athletics
World Athletics Championships medalists
World Athletics Indoor Championships medalists
European Athletics Championships medalists
World record holders in masters athletics
World Athletics indoor record holders (relay)
European Athlete of the Year winners
BBC Sports Personality of the Year winners
Officers of the Order of the British Empire
Doping cases in athletics
English sportspeople in doping cases
Jamaican sportspeople in doping cases
English people of Jamaican descent
Black British sportsmen
Jamaican emigrants to the United Kingdom
English motivational speakers
World Athletics Championships winners
I'm a Celebrity...Get Me Out of Here! (British TV series) participants
Members of Thames Valley Harriers
Medallists at the 1986 Commonwealth Games
Medallists at the 1990 Commonwealth Games
Medallists at the 1994 Commonwealth Games